Bousta is a settlement on Mainland, in Shetland, Scotland. Bousta is situated in the parish of Walls and Sandness.

Scott's Hawkweed is native to the pastures west of Bousta. Barnacle geese have been observed at Bousta, as well as seals.

References

External links

Canmore - Muckle Bousta site record
Canmore - Little Bousta, Norse Mill site record

Villages in Mainland, Shetland